Iliyan Nedkov (born 18 March 1958) is a Bulgarian former judoka who competed in the 1980 Summer Olympics.

References

1958 births
Living people
Bulgarian male judoka
Olympic judoka of Bulgaria
Judoka at the 1980 Summer Olympics
Olympic bronze medalists for Bulgaria
Olympic medalists in judo
Medalists at the 1980 Summer Olympics